Tecsun Co., Ltd. is a Chinese company founded in 1994 and headquartered in Dongguan, Guangdong. It designs and manufactures radios, from simple handheld AM/FM receivers to more sophisticated digital units with shortwave, longwave, airband, and SSB capability.  Some of their products are rebranded and sold by Eton Corporation.

References

External links

Electronics companies of China
Manufacturing companies established in 1994
1994 establishments in China
Companies based in Guangdong
Radio manufacturers